The Packard Single-Cylinder cars are a group of cars made by the Packard automobile company from 1899-1903 in Warren, Ohio. The four cylinder Model K was introduced in 1903.

Models 

Model A(1899): The Model A was the first automobile produced by the Packard Motor Company.  Only five were made. The last one produced was also the first Packard sold, to a Warren, Ohio, business man named George Kirkham.

Model B(1900–1901): The Model B was the second model produced by Packard.  Steering was still by a lever, but a foot pedal was now used for speed control rather than a lever like in the Model A.

Model C(1901): The Model C was the third model produced by Packard. It was one step up from the Model B with a more powerful engine. It was also the first Packard to use a steering wheel instead of a tiller.

Model F (1901–1903): The Packard Model F was the last single-cylinder car made by the Packard Motor Company. It had some major advances, including a new 3-speed transmission. When it competed in an economy contest, the Model F averaged  mpg. It was the most expensive Packard till then, costing $2,500 in 1902(the price was lowered to $2,300 in 1903). It was replaced by the Model G.

References

External links
 1903 Transcontinental Tour in a Packard F

First car made by manufacturer
Single cylinder